This is the discography of Devlin, an English rapper from Dagenham, East London, England signed to Island Records. Part of Grime collective 'O.T Crew' with Dogzilla, Deeper man, M. Eye, Benson, Kozy, Syer Bars and Daze. Devlin was also a member of The Movement, consisting of himself, Wretch 32, Scorcher, Ghetts, Lightning, Mercston and DJ Unique.

His debut album, Bud, Sweat and Beers was released on Island Records in 2010. The first single from the album was "Brainwashed", which was released on 8 August 2010 in the UK and debuted on the UK Singles Chart at number 31, and number 11 on the UK R&B Chart. The second single, "Runaway", was released on 24 October 2010, where it debuted at number 15, marking Devlin's most successful single to date. The single was succeeded by the release of the debut album, Bud, Sweat and Beers, which was released on 1 November 2010 and debuted at number 21 on the UK Albums Chart. "London City" entered the UK chart at number 181 following strong digital downloads from the album. The third single released from the album was "Let It Go" featuring British-producer Labrinth. The track, which was released on 31 January 2011, charted at number 59 in the UK based on downloads alone. In January 2011, Devlin appeared on Jessie J's UK version of "Price Tag".

Devlin stated on an interview with Tim Westwood on BBC Radio 1Xtra that his second album will be released in October 2012, and it will be called A Moving Picture.

Albums

Studio albums

Mixtapes

Extended plays

Singles

As lead artist

As featured artist

Other charted songs

Other appearances

Music videos

References

Discographies of British artists